Børge Larsen (15 February 1911 – 7 July 1979) was a Danish middle-distance runner. He competed in the men's 1500 metres at the 1936 Summer Olympics.

References

1911 births
1979 deaths
Athletes (track and field) at the 1936 Summer Olympics
Danish male middle-distance runners
Olympic athletes of Denmark
Place of birth missing
20th-century Danish people